The Rugby League World Cup is an international rugby league tournament contested by the top national men's representative teams. The tournament is administered by the International Rugby League and was first held in France in 1954, which was the first World Cup held for any form of rugby football.

The idea of a rugby league World Cup tournament was first mooted in the 1930s with the French proposal to hold a tournament in 1931, and again in 1951. The tournament's structure, frequency, and size has varied significantly throughout its history. The winners are awarded the Paul Barrière Trophy, named after Paul Barrière, the French Rugby League President of the 1940s and 1950s. Three nations have won the tournament;  twelve times,  three times, and  once. Australia has been in the final of every World Cup, except the first in 1954, when they came third, which was considered to be a complete upset with the bookmakers at the time having Australia as strong favourites.

The last World Cup was held in England in 2022 after being delayed by a year due to the Covid 19 pandemic. The next World Cup will be held in France in 2025.

History

1935–1960: Establishment and Early World Cups

The Rugby League World Cup was an initiative of the French who had been campaigning for a competition since 1935. The idea was raised in 1951 by Paul Barrière, the President of the French Rugby League. In 1952, Rugby Football League secretary Bill Fallowfield persuaded the Rugby League Council to support the concept. At a meeting in Blackpool, England in 1953, the International Board accepted Paul Barrière's proposal that France should be the nation to host the first tournament to be officially
known as the "Rugby World Cup". In addition to the hosts, the tournament featured teams from Britain, Australia and New Zealand. The 1954 Rugby League World Cup was won by Great Britain who defeated France in Paris on 13 November to claim the title.

Following the success of the maiden World Cup three years later another tournament was held in Australia, marking 50 years of rugby league in the country. Unlike the previous tournament, teams played each other in a league format. It was then decided that the team that finished first in the league would be declared the winner. Australia proved victorious on their home ground.

Another three years would pass until the next World Cup in 1960, this time held in England. It would be the second time Great Britain won the competition. Despite a home nation victory the World Cup suffered from poor crowds due to the live broadcast of games for the first time.

1960–1974: Sporadic competitions 
After a disappointing attendances in 1960, the World Cup would not be played for another eight years. The competition had been scheduled to be held in France in 1965, this time with the inclusion of the South African team. However, after an unsuccessful tour of Australia, the French withdrew, effectively postponing the tournament until 1968, when Australia and New Zealand hosted and the World Cup Final made a return.

The World Cup found more success in the 70s with four tournaments being played. The first, the 1972 World Cup where the final was contested between Great Britain and Australia ended 10–10, and the title was awarded to Great Britain by virtue of their superior record in the qualifiers. Great Britain were captained by Welshman Clive Sullivan who was the first black player to captain any British national sports team. The final at the Stade de Gerland in Lyon witnessed what is (as of 2021) the last British team to win the Rugby League World Cup.

1975–1990s: No host nations 

In 1975, the competition underwent a radical overhaul. It was decided to play matches on a home and away basis around the world instead of one host nation and the Great Britain team was split into England and Wales meaning that the tournament would be increased from the four teams of previous tournaments to five, this number also taking part in the two future internationally held tournaments. There was not a final held to decide the champions of the 1975 tournament and so Australia won by virtue of topping the group standings.  As Australia had not beaten England in that tournament a 'final challenge match' was hastily arranged which Australia would win 25–0.

In 1977 it was decided that Great Britain should once more compete as a single entity. Although the final between Australia and Great Britain was a closely fought affair, public interest in the tournament waned due to the continuing tinkering with the format and it was not held again until the mid-1980s.

From 1985 to 1988, each nation played each other a number of times on a home and away basis with a number of these games also being considered part of various international tours that took place during the years in which these world cups were being played.  At the end of that period, Australia met New Zealand at Eden Park. The match was a physical encounter, and Australian captain Wally Lewis played part of the match with a broken arm. The Kangaroos won the competition 25–12 in front of a capacity crowd of nearly 48,000 spectators.

This format was repeated from 1989 to 1992 (with games once again also being part of tours) and Australia won again, defeating Great Britain 10–6 at Wembley Stadium in front of 73,361 people. This crowd remained a Rugby League World Cup record (and a record for any rugby league international match) until beaten by the 74,468 crowd which attended the 2013 World Cup Final at Old Trafford. The fifth nation to compete in these two tournaments was Papua New Guinea, where rugby league is the national, and most popular, sport.

1995–2008: Birth of the modern World Cup 

In 1995, the competition was held in England and Wales. It was again restructured, returning to the traditional 'host' format, with ten teams entering. Unlike previous tournaments where the top two teams in the table played in the final, a knockout stage was added, with quarter and semi-finals. New teams competing included Fiji, Tonga, Samoa and South Africa. Due to the Super League war, players aligned with the Super League competition were not selected by the ARL to represent Australia, which meant the absence of many star players. The tournament, which was also held to celebrate the centenary of the sport, saw over 250,000 people attending the group stages and over 66,000 people attending the final, in which Australia defeated England 16–8.

Following the success of 1995, plans were drawn up to have a World Cup every three years, rather than the sporadic staging of the competition in the past. However, the Super League war and the subsequent re-structuring of rugby league's international governing bodies meant that the proposed 1998 World Cup was postponed.

In 2000, the World Cup was held in the United Kingdom, Ireland, and France, and expanded the field further, with sixteen teams entering. This tournament included a New Zealand Maori representative team, the only time this team has taken part. Numerous issues, including poor organization and blown-out scorelines, meant that this tournament was seen as highly unsuccessful with an average attendance just half that of the previous tournament.  Due to these problems the competition was put on indefinite hiatus. Australia won the tournament by beating New Zealand 40–12 in the final at Old Trafford, Manchester.  In the same year, the first Women's Rugby League World Cup was held, with New Zealand defeating Great Britain.

After the failure of the 2000 World Cup, no plans were made for another tournament until 2008 with the competition reverting to a 10-team format. Australia hosted the tournament and New Zealand were crowned champions for the first time by beating the host nation at Lang Park, Brisbane. The tournament was once again seen as a success with a 91% average attendance increase on the previous competition.  New Zealand became only the third team to win the world cup and the first other than Australia since 1972.

2009–present: Regular competition 

Five years on from the 2008 World Cup there was still an appetite for a regular World Cup. 2013 saw England and Wales host the tournament and expanded to 14 teams. This was considered the most successful competition since 1995 in terms of attendances, exposure and financial output. Australia took the title again after defeating New Zealand in the final by a score of 34–2.  The final attendance became the record international rugby league attendance at 74,468.

Following the success of the 2013 tournament, it was decided that the World Cup would be scheduled to take place every four years, 2017 Rugby League World Cup taking place in Australia, New Zealand and for the first time in Papua New Guinea.  While Australia would claim the title once again and for an eleventh time, the tournament was considered highly successful in terms of competitiveness.  The tournament would see Tonga beat New Zealand in the group stages with a score of 28–22 to top the group, the first time a team from outside the top 3 had beaten a top 3 nation in over two decades.  New Zealand went on to play Fiji in the quarter-finals and lost once again with a score of just 4–2, knocking New Zealand out in the quarter-finals, the first time a tier 1 nation had exited the tournament at this early stage.  Tonga played England in the semi-finals and while conceding 20 unanswered points, they would score 3 tries in just the last seven minutes to pull the score back to 20–18, eventually losing by this close margin.  The final was contested between Australia and England at Lang Park, Brisbane and Australia won by just 6–0, the lowest score in world cup final history.	

England were chosen to host the 2021 tournament which was postponed to 2022 due to the COVID-19 pandemic, with organisers expressing a desire to see a total of one million fans attend games.  This tournament saw the number of teams increased to 16 once again.

A proposal was put forward in 2016 to hold the 2025 Rugby League World Cup in the United States and Canada, but in December 2018 plans for the tournament to be held in North America were scrapped due to financial concerns.

On 11 January 2022, it was announced France would host the tournament in 2025.

Trophy 

The World Cup trophy was commissioned by French Fédération Française de Rugby à XIII president Paul Barrière at a cost of eight million francs, and then donated to the International Rugby League Board to be used for the inaugural competition in 1954. This trophy was used and presented to the winning nation for the first four tournaments, before being stolen in 1970. After its recovery, the trophy was reinstated for the 2000 tournament.

Format

Qualification 

Australia, France and New Zealand are the only nations who have appeared at every Rugby League World Cup from 1954 to 2021. England has also been at all, but participated under the banner of Great Britain in the majority of the earlier tournaments. Wales, including as Great Britain, has competed in all but the 2008 tournament.

In total, 19 teams have taken part in the World Cup.  While 18 of these represented nations, 1 did not; in 2000, the Aotearoa Māori team was granted entry to the competition.  This team is made up of New Zealand Māori players and was knocked out of the world cup in the pool stage.  Only one other team has taken part in just a single world cup; Russia. In total 29 teams have/will taken part in qualifying rounds while five other teams have always been granted automatic qualification, meaning 34 teams have taken part in some stage of the world cup.

Qualifying rounds were first introduced for the 2000 World Cup.  Rounds take the form of groups of teams from specific continents/regions; Europe, Middle-East/Africa, Asia/Pacific and the Americas.  Teams that automatically qualify are the quarter-finalists from the previous World Cup.

Qualifying for the 2021 World Cup featured 20 teams, the most to date with 8 teams having automatically qualified. 13 of these teams had never qualified for the World Cup before. 14 teams took part in the European stage of the qualifying with 4 teams in the Americas group and three in the world play-offs where the runner-up of the Americas group met the highest ranked teams from Asia/Pacific and Middle-East/Africa.

Finals 
The Rugby League World Cup has followed a varied range of formats throughout its history as the number of teams participating has increased.

The current format has been in use since the 2021 tournament, featuring 16 teams split into four groups of four. Two teams from each group qualify for the knockout stage. Each team is awarded two points for a win and one point for a draw.

The eight teams in the quarter finals play each other with the four winners progressing to the semi finals before the World Cup Final. If the teams are level after 80 minutes extra time will be played and if the two teams are still level after extra time, a golden point will be played.

Hosts 

Due to the early World Cups being contested between Australia, England, France and New Zealand and the fact rugby league is most popular in these regions they have regularly hosted the World Cup between themselves. World Cups in 1985–88 and 1989–92 were all jointly hosted by the four founding nations.

New Zealand has never solely hosted a World Cup but they have co-hosted with Australia on three occasions with 2017 also jointly co-hosted with Papua New Guinea. England have co-hosted once with Wales in 2013 although the 2000 World Cup was played across the UK as well as some games in Ireland and France.

France hosted the first World Cup in 1954 and again in 1972 as well as hosting games at the 2000 and 2013 World Cups. They are due to host the 2025 World Cup.

Despite the World Cup mainly being hosted by England, Australia, France and New Zealand, countries such as UAE, South Africa and the United States and Canada have applied to host the tournament in the past. 

Co-hosted between confederation

Stadiums 

In total, 81 stadiums have hosted world cup games over the 14 tournaments. Headingley Stadium in Leeds has hosted the tournament the most times, having had games in 7 world cups with Central Park, Wigan and Lang Park, Brisbane having hosted 6 tournaments.  52 stadiums have hosted matches in just 1 tournament.  The most stadiums used in a tournament was in 2000 when 26 stadiums were used; the stadium capacity was the highest ever at 704,400. However, the occupancy was also the lowest ever at just 37.46%.

The largest stadium in terms of capacity ever used was Wembley Stadium, London with a seating capacity of 90,000; the stadium was used in the 2013 tournament as the venue for the semi-final double-header. The smallest stadium ever used was also in 2013 when The Gnoll, Neath, with a capacity of 5,000 hosted a game between Wales and Cook Islands. Despite this, it was not the lowest attended game; this was in the 2000 World Cup when just 1,497 attended the game between Wales and Lebanon at Stradey Park, Llanelli.

The cities with the most stadiums used are Sydney and London with 4 each. Hull and Auckland are the cities with the next highest number with 3 each.

Results

Summary 
In total, 21 teams have competed at the World Cup. Of these only three have won the World Cup with Australia being by far the most successful with 12 titles. Great Britain won three titles however since 1995 they have competed separately as England, Wales, Scotland and Ireland. New Zealand became only the third team to win the World Cup in 2008.

England, France and Samoa are the only teams to have played in the final and not won. Wales’ best result was third under the old format and have made the semi finals twice while Fiji have appeared in three while Tonga have made the semi finals just once.

Papau New Guinea achieved Fourth place under the old format and have made it to three Quarter Finals. Four other teams; Ireland, Lebanon, Scotland and the USA have all made the Quarter Finals bringing the total amount of teams to reach the knockout stage to 14.

 Tournaments between 1954–1992 did not feature semi-final and quarter-final rounds.

Records

Attendance

Match attendance 
Top 10 match attendances.

See also 

 Women's Rugby League World Cup
 Wheelchair Rugby League World Cup
 Tertiary Student Rugby League World Cup
 Rugby League World Cup records
 List of international rugby league teams
 RLIF World Rankings
 Rugby League Americas Championship
 Rugby League Asian Cup
 Rugby League European Championship
 Rugby League Mediterranean Cup
 Rugby League Middle East - Africa Championship
 Rugby League Pacific Cup
 Rugby League South American Championship
 Rugby League Four Nations

Notes

References

Inline

General

External links 

 Official Rugby League World Cup Website
 Rugby League International Federation
 BBC website, History (1954–2000) retrieved 2 May 2006
 "RLIF Meeting", 2008 World Cup European Rugby League Federation, retrieved May 8, 2006
 "Kiwi hangover after the hype", 2013 World Cup retrieved 8 May 2006
 Rugby League World Cup at napit.co.uk

Further reading 
 

 
Rugby league international tournaments
Rugby league
Recurring sporting events established in 1954
Quadrennial sporting events
World cups